The Cooperstown and Charlotte Valley Railroad Company  is a heritage railroad in New York, operated by the Leatherstocking Chapter of the National Railway Historical Society (NRHS) since 1996.

History
In 1865, the Articles of Association for the Cooperstown and Susquehanna Valley R.R. Company (C&SVRR) were filed. The stated purpose was to construct a railroad "from a point at or near the Village of Cooperstown to a point at or near Colliersville forming a junction with the Albany and Susquehanna Rail Road". In February, 1868, work was started on the line. However, the first train was not run until July 14, 1869. The road was broad-gauge, to be compatible with the Albany & Susquehanna. On May 28, 1876, the entire  was "narrowed-up" (standard-gauged); "the work being completed by 4 p.m."

On June 6, 1880, the enginehouse of the C&SVRR burned, damaging the road's two engines and destroying a baggage car. The names of the engines were "The Otsego" and "Middlefield".

Two extensions of the C&SVRR were authorized by the State. The first, in 1869, ran from Cooperstown to Richfield Springs. It was abandoned in 1941. The second, in 1885, ran from its "southern terminus ... to or near the 'Hemlocks' on the Charlotte creek in the town of Davenport. It was abandoned in the early 1900's.

In 1888, Articles of Association were filed for the Cooperstown and Charlotte Valley R.R. Co. (C&CVRR) The C&CVRR was likewise authorized to build from the "Hemlocks", but only as far as the lands of Matthew Ward in the town of Davenport.

In February, 1891, the West Davenport R. R. was chartered. It was authorized to build from the West Davenport depot of the C&CVRR to the lands of "the McLaury sisters a short distance east of the Kort Right Brook". On April 13, 1891, the C&CVRR and the West Davenport R.R. were consolidated. Two days later, the C&CVRR leased the C&SVRR.
 
The line was formed by "men in Cooperstown" in 1888, because Thomas Cornell, of Kingston, had "procrastinated" since 1872 in extending his Ulster & Delaware Railroad west from Stamford to Oneonta: not completed until 1900. The plan was to extend the existing line from Cooperstown to Cooperstown Junction eastward. The intended route was "along the Charlotte Valley through Davenport Center, Harpersfield; thence to Cooksburg, onetime terminal of the Canajoharie & Catskill, and down Catskill Creek to a connection with the West Shore Railroad". In fact, the connection to the Ulster & Delaware was only built for the few miles between Cooperstown Junction and West Davenport (see below).

Work on this railroad started after the blizzard of 1888. By 1889, "the track of the new C&CV progressed eastward for only 6 miles to West Davenport, though graders built culverts, fills and rock cuttings up the valley of Charlotte Creek beyond Davenport, well into Harpersfield Township, before the winter of 1889-90 set in."

"Early in February, 1890, the C&CV tracklayers reached Davenport Center, while the graders resumed work east of Harpersfield."

Cornell died on March 30, 1890, and his nephew Edwin Young became his executor. The Young family's "influence in Cooperstown" was undoubtedly what stopped all further work on the C&CV. The track of the latter ended at West Davenport, and "there it remained for many a year."

For several years, there was a "Tally-Ho" stagecoach link between Bloomville and Davenport Center for those who wished to travel by rail from Kingston to Cooperstown. The stagecoach filled the railroad gap between these two rail termini, prior to the 1900 completion of the U&D to Davenport Center, West Davenport and Oneonta.

In March, 1899, the U&D began work west of Bloomville. When it reached Davenport Center, "no connection with the C&CV tracks was made, the new line traversing Charlotte Creek on a steel bridge, then following the north bank of the creek to West Davenport where a connection was made with the C&CV, the two roads using a joint station".

Rail service south from Cooperstown Junction to the U&D connection ceased on August 10, 1905.

Delaware and Hudson ownership
In 1934, the New York State Public Service Commission permitted the discontinuance of all passenger service on the C&CV. The last scheduled passenger train left Cooperstown for Cooperstown Junction on June 24, 1934.

The C&CV came under the ownership of the Delaware and Hudson Company in 1903 and became known as the "Cooperstown Branch". The D&H built an ornate stone station in Cooperstown shortly after the takeover. Along with a branch to Cherry Valley, the former C&CV line became a rural feeder into the D&H mainline. The D&H constructed a turntable and small locomotive maintenance facility in Cooperstown, which were removed in the 1950s. The C&CV was merged into the D&H effective March 1, 1957.

On September 10 and 11, 1949, the New York Freedom Train visited Cooperstown, drawing over 4,000 visitors.

The line carried on a quiet existence, using S-type Alco switchers, and even an RS-11 made an appearance in the 1960s. Through the 1960s, the former C&CV line experienced declining traffic under D&H ownership.

Delaware Otsego ownership
The remaining segment of the C&CV line from Cooperstown Junction to Cooperstown was sold by the D&H in 1970 to the Delaware Otsego Corporation. The sale took place after Delaware Otsego was forced to sell a 2.6-mile ex-New York Central Railroad line (the farthest-western end of its former Catskill Mountain Branch) at Oneonta, during the construction of Interstate 88 between Binghamton and Albany. Condemnation of this short U&D sector by NYSDOT saved the far-greater cost of building a large, concrete I-88 highway bridge over one deteriorated remnant of a branch line that had already been abandoned between Bloomville and Mickle Bridge, near West Davenport, in July, 1965.
Delaware Otsego resurrected the C&CV name, which was last used in 1903 when the company was purchased by the D&H.

The C&CV built new locomotive maintenance facilities at Milford, and the headquarters for Delaware Otsego Corporation were located in the former Cooperstown station: the stone passenger station that the D&H built shortly after the 1903 takeover of the C&CV.

The C&CV operated a heritage railroad during the 1970s, using an ex-Virginia Blue Ridge Railroad 0-6-0 steam locomotive until 1974 and diesel locomotives thereafter for the remainder of the decade. Excursion trains continued with diesel locomotives on weekends until the mid-1980s.

Freight traffic on the C&CV declined by the early 1980s to several cars per week: typically, loads of lumber to Portlandville; animal feed to Agway in Milford and freight for several customers in Cooperstown.

The C&CV was used during the 1980s to store large numbers of idle St. Lawrence Railroad boxcars. Several of these cars were stored on Clintonville Hill in the vicinity of milepost 7, secured only with handbrakes despite the steepness of the grade. On one occasion, vandals released the brakes on several cars, which rolled southward and derailed at the foot of the grade. Metal pieces from the wreck can be found between the railroad right-of-way and the west bank of the Susquehanna River.

The last C&CV freight train operated in December, 1987, followed by infrequent equipment moves until the railroad was purchased by the Leatherstocking Chapter of the National Railway Historical Society, in 1996.

Leatherstocking chapter, NRHS ownership

The Leatherstocking Railway Historical Society (Leatherstocking Chapter NRHS) purchased the line from the Delaware Otsego Corporation in 1996.

Volunteers performed vegetation removal and trackbed rehabilitation before the line was reopened for seasonal passenger excursion trains, between Cooperstown and Milford, in 1999, retaining the C&CV name. Following a 2021 announcement, the railroad plans to reopen the entire 16-mile line between Cooperstown and Cooperstown Junction, connection with the Norfolk Southern Railway (former Delaware and Hudson mainline), in 2023.

Initially, the C&CV leased a former New York, Ontario and Western Railway locomotive, as well as two locomotives from the Green Mountain Railroad. It currently owns and operates a pair of ex-Canadian National Railway MLW switchers (Alco S-4 and Alco S-7 designs), which were acquired from Atlas Steel in Welland, Ontario. These locomotives continue the numbering scheme used by the D&H for its S series switchers (C&CV #3051 and #3052). As of late 2012, unit 3051 has been painted into a D&H scheme, with C&CV lettering. The 3052 is being painted as time permits, in service with half black paint and half blue from its previous owner. As of August, 2015, unit 3052 had been restored to its original Canadian National paint scheme with its CN number #8223.

Notably, the Leatherstocking Railroad Museum has a pair 
of former Amtrak GG1 electric locomotives (built by the Pennsylvania Railroad's own Altoona Shops as #4909 in December, 1941 and #4917 in June, 1942), both owned by the NRHS Leatherstocking Chapter itself as of January 17, 2022. On this date, #4909 was deeded to the Chapter as a gift by The Henry Ford Museum of Dearborn, Michigan. This locomotive had been purchased for $15,000 by the Museum from its owner, Chapter President Bruce E. Hodges, a number of years ago.  However, both Canadian Pacific and its successor as the only connecting railroad—Norfolk Southern—finally refused to ever move it from Cooperstown Junction to Dearborn, due to alleged "clearance issues" and its 475,000-pound weight. The Leatherstocking Museum is one of only three museums to possess more than one GG1; both the Railroad Museum of Pennsylvania (Strasburg, PA) and the United Railroad Historical Society (Boonton, NJ) also have two each. Ten other U.S. museums have one each, with totals of 16 GG1's preserved and 123 scrapped (most following Conrail retirement in 1979 and total retirement by all operators in 1983). On the PRR, Penn Central and Amtrak, they ran between Washington, DC and New Haven, CT; between Philadelphia and Harrisburg, PA; and on several electrified freight branches such as the Trenton Cutoff (Morrisville-Glenloch, PA).

CACV also owns or has constructed Maintenance of Way equipment.

External links 

Cooperstown & Charlotte Valley Railroad at Abandoned
Delaware Otsego System Tribute

References

Gerald M. Best (1972), The Ulster and Delaware. . .Railroad Through the Catskills, San Marino, California: Golden West Books.

6 ft gauge railways in the United States
Heritage railroads in New York (state)
Predecessors of the Delaware and Hudson Railway
Railway companies established in 1888
Railway companies disestablished in 1957
Defunct New York (state) railroads
Transportation in Otsego County, New York
Tourist attractions in Otsego County, New York